V for Vendetta is a British graphic novel written by Alan Moore and illustrated by David Lloyd.

V for Vendetta may also refer to:

 V for Vendetta (film), a 2005 thriller film based on the novel
 V for Vendetta: Music from the Motion Picture, the soundtrack 
 "V for Vendetta", a 1965 episode of TV series 12 O'Clock High

See also
 V (character), the title character of the comic book series V for Vendetta 
 Guy Fawkes mask, a major plot element in V for Vendetta
 "V" Is for Vengeance, a 2011 novel by Sue Grafton